Los Angeles Apparel is a manufacturer, designer and distributor of clothing based in South-Central Los Angeles. The company was founded in 2016 by Dov Charney, the founder of American Apparel. Los Angeles Apparel is a vertically integrated manufacturer and currently employs over 1500 personnel.

History
Los Angeles Apparel was founded by Dov Charney in 2016 in Los Angeles, California after he was ousted from American Apparel by its board. Charney rejected a $4.5 million severance package and role as "creative director" in the company and launched Los Angeles Apparel as a wholesale business, similar to American Apparel's origins in 1989. Los Angeles Apparel consists of about 1,800+ employees, including many former American Apparel workers. About 90 percent of the factory's machinery once belonged to American Apparel. According to Bloomberg, Charney bought fabric, computers, sewing machines, and other equipments from American Apparel in the bankruptcy sale. In late 2016, Cincinnati based TSC Apparel made a multimillion-dollar business deal with Los Angeles Apparel, selling the startup's clothes to concert producer Live Nation Entertainment and screen printers who previously purchased American Apparel.

Production
Los Angeles Apparel was started as a wholesale business. The company is upfront about the fact that its clothing and business model is similar to that of American Apparel. Los Angeles Apparel is a manufacturer and distributor of apparel to screen printers, apparel companies, and boutiques. The company focuses on production of T-shirts, sweatshirts, cotton bodysuits and swimwear. The company is a vertically integrated manufacturer with knitting and dyeing done in Los Angeles. Los Angeles Apparel's 100,000 square foot factory has a current capacity of 140,000 units per week. The company is devoted to keeping production domestic and employing garment workers in Los Angeles.

Similar to the values held by American Apparel, the corporate identity has a commitment to "sweatshop free" manufacturing.  All workers earn fair wages, approximately $20 an hour with chance of productivity bonuses.  In an effort to emphasize the importance of the workers who produce the apparel, their names and faces were printed on the labels of shirts back in 2017. Ethicality and humanness are themes congruent to the success of Los Angeles Apparel.

Corporate culture

Fair wage labor practice
Los Angeles Apparel supports and strives for fair wage labor practices. The company's workers typically earn wages of $16.50 - $20 per hour. The workers at Los Angeles Apparel own equity in the company making it employee owned. The company focuses on local manufacturing and attempts to employ workers in the Los Angeles area.

Vertical integration
Los Angeles Apparel is a vertically integrated company, expanding its business operations into different steps on the same production path. The company has total control over the supply chain from manufacturing to end sales. Los Angeles Apparel purchases textile and yarn products made in USA, supporting local manufacturing. More than half of yarn utilization is acquired from domestic sources.

Environment friendly production
Los Angeles Apparel integrates organic cotton and reclaimed cotton into their supply chain. The company plans to recycle almost 100 percent of their waste by 2018.

References

External links

Clothing brands of the United States
Clothing manufacturers
Companies based in Los Angeles
Manufacturing companies based in California
Retail companies based in California
Retail companies established in 2016